The Langdon House is a historic house on the eastern side of Cincinnati, Ohio, United States.  Located along Eastern Avenue, it is a frame house with weatherboarded walls, built in the Steamboat Gothic style.  It was erected in 1855 in the village of Columbia, which has since been annexed to the city of Cincinnati.  Seven years after it was constructed, its owner, Henry Langdon, joined the 79th Ohio Infantry to fight in the Civil War.  After his return in 1865, Langdon returned to his Columbia house; there he maintained a medical practice until his 1876 death.

In 1969, the Langdon House was listed on the National Register of Historic Places.  Key to its inclusion is its unusually well-preserved historic architecture: almost no other Steamboat Gothic houses remain in Cincinnati.

References

Houses completed in 1855
Carpenter Gothic houses in Ohio
Houses in Cincinnati
Houses on the National Register of Historic Places in Ohio
National Register of Historic Places in Cincinnati